Trying to Save Piggy Sneed is a collection of short works by novelist John Irving, first published by Arcade Publishing in 1996.  It features twelve writing pieces divided into three sections: Memoirs, Fiction, and Homage.

Memoirs
 "Trying to Save Piggy Sneed" (short story)
 "The Imaginary Girlfriend"
 "My Dinner at the Whitehouse"

Fiction
 "Interior Space"
 "Brennbar's Rant"
 "The Pension Grillparzer"
 "Other People's Dreams"
 "Weary Kingdom"
 "Almost in Iowa"

Homage
 "The King of the Novel"
 "An Introduction to A Christmas Carol"
 "Gunter Grass: King of the Toy Merchants"

Following each piece, Irving included sections entitled "Author's Notes," where he discussed his inspiration for the pieces and the methods of their creation.

1996 short story collections
Short story collections by John Irving
Arcade Publishing books